is the first, and currently only live album of the Japanese rock band, The Back Horn.  The album was released on August 24, 2005.

Track listing

Kagi overture (鍵 overture) – 2:16
Tobira (扉) – 4:46
Unmei Fukuzatsukossetsu (運命複雑骨折) – 4:33
Cobalt Blue (コバルトブルー) – 4:25
Koufuku na Nakigara (幸福な亡骸) – 5:29
Ame (雨) – 6:03
Mugen no Arano (無限の荒野) – 4:10
Hakaishi Fever (墓石フィーバー) – 4:31
Headphone Children (ヘッドフォンチルドレン) – 9:03
Naiteiru Hito (泣いている人) – 8:01
Namida ga Koboretara (涙がこぼれたら) – 5:32
Sunny (サニー) – 4:03
Hikari no Kesshou (光の結晶) – 6:06
KIZUNA Song (キズナソング) – 6:32

The Back Horn albums
2005 live albums